Garagoa is a town and municipality in Colombia, located in the Boyacá Department. It is the capital of the province of Neira. It is also the seat of the Diocese of Garagoa of the Catholic Church. The municipality is situated in the Eastern Ranges of the Colombian Andes and borders Chinavita in the north, Macanal in the south, Tenza and Sutatenza in the west and Miraflores and Chinavita in the east.

Etymology 
Garagoa in Chibcha means "Behind the hill" or "On the other side of the hill".

History 
In the times before the Spanish conquest, the area of Garagoa was inhabited by the Muisca, organized in their loose Muisca Confederation. Garagoa was ruled by the zaque based in Hunza. Garagoa was visited by conquistador Gonzalo Jimenez de Quesada in 1539, and was elevated to municipal status on October 5, 1809.

Economy 
Main economical activities of Garagoa are agriculture, livestock farming and mining. Among the agricultural products, most important are maize, yuca, potatoes, arracacha, bananas, peas, beans, pumpkins, tomatoes, fique, coffee and sugar cane. Also mangoes, chirimoya, oranges, avocadoes, pineapples, mandarines, papayas, maracuyá and guayaba are produced. Mining is mostly coal.

Trivia 
 The tree frog Dendropsophus garagoensis has been found in and named after Garagoa

Gallery

References

External links 
 Diocese of Garagoa

Municipalities of Boyacá Department
1809 establishments in the Spanish Empire
Populated places established in 1809
Muysccubun